Metodije Spasovski (born 4 February 1946) is a former Macedonian football player. He capped three times for the Yugoslav national team.

Club career
Spasovski played a total of 647 games in all competitions for hometown club Vardar, scoring 212 goals and ranking him second on both the club's record appearances and scorers lists.

International career
He made his senior debut for Yugoslavia in a December 1968 friendly match against Brazil in which he immediately scored a goal and has earned a total of 3 caps, scoring 3 goals. His final international was an October 1969 FIFA World Cup qualification match against Belgium.

References

External links
 
 Profile at Serbian federation official site
 

1946 births
Living people
Footballers from Skopje
Association football midfielders
Yugoslav footballers
Yugoslavia international footballers
Macedonian footballers
FK Vardar players
1. FC Saarbrücken players
Yugoslav First League players
Yugoslav Second League players
Bundesliga players
Yugoslav expatriate footballers
Expatriate footballers in Germany
Yugoslav expatriate sportspeople in Germany
Macedonian football managers
FK Vardar managers